Jackleg Devotional to the Heart  is the second full-length album released on May 21, 2013, by the Denton, Texas based band The Baptist Generals, and their third release on US label Sub Pop.

Track listing

All songs written by Chris "Cee" Flemmons.

External links
  Jackleg Devotional to the Heart on subpop.com
  Baptist General Sub Pop Records Playlist on YouTube

References

2013 albums
Sub Pop albums
Folk albums by American artists